Green T. Johnston was a state legislator who represented Dallas County, Alabama during the Reconstruction era. He was elected to the Alabama House of Representatives in 1876 from Dallas County.

Dallas County was part of Alabama's "Black Belt" counties. Johnston and a small number of others from the area were among the last state legislators to serve before Reconstruction ended and Democrats retook power. Only two African Americans were elected to the Alabama House in 1878.

Johnston sponsored a bill to repeal sunset laws that prevented African American farmers from selling their crops after sunset. A Republican, he was a farmer and lived in Hamburg, Alabama. He testified he was a deputy marshal during the 1880 election.

See also
African-American officeholders during and following the Reconstruction era

References

Members of the Alabama House of Representatives
African-American state legislators in Alabama
Year of birth missing
Year of death missing
19th-century American politicians
African-American politicians during the Reconstruction Era
People from Perry County, Alabama
Farmers from Alabama